Entre brumas, is a Mexican telenovela produced by Ernesto Alonso for Televisa in 1973. It stars Celia Castro, Ricardo Blume and Rita Macedo.

Plot 
The story is set in England, where Deborah Winters is a very repressed woman, dominated by his father and who has grown up in the shadow of her beautiful but cruel friend, Linda Anderson. This always has taken away to Deborah everything she wants, including Paul Anderson, who is in love with Deborah.

Cast 
 Celia Castro as Deborah Winters
 Ricardo Blume as Paul Anderson
 Rita Macedo as Linda Anderson
 Macaria as Doris
 Narciso Busquets as Jean Louis
 Miguel Manzano as Charlie
 María Rubio as Susan
 Alicia Montoya as Sarah
 Otto Sirgo as Enrico Petrini
 Lucía Guilmáin as Mary
 Guillermo Murray as Robert Green
 José Luis Jiménez as Sir James Winters
 Alfonso Meza as Oscar Anderson
 Gloria Guzmán as Sra. Lester
 Héctor Sáez as Bill
 Malena Doria as Elizabeth
 Ignacio Rubiell as Ruby
 Tita Grieg as Ángela
 Roberto Antúnez as Ricardo
 José Antonio Ferral as Tom

References

External links 

Mexican telenovelas
1973 telenovelas
Televisa telenovelas
Spanish-language telenovelas
1973 Mexican television series debuts
1973 Mexican television series endings